The Atlanta and West Point Rail Road  was a railroad in the U.S. state of Georgia, forming the east portion of the Atlanta-Selma West Point Route. The company was chartered in 1847 as the Atlanta and LaGrange Rail Road and renamed in 1857; construction of the  gauge line was begun in 1849-50 and completed in May 1854. A large minority interest owned by the Georgia Railroad and Banking Company eventually passed under the control of the Atlantic Coast Line Railroad (ACL), which later acquired a majority of the stock.

In the late 20th century restructuring, through the Seaboard Coast Line Railroad (SCL), successor to the ACL, the A&WP came under the Family Lines System banner in 1972.  Years later in June 1983, it was merged into the Seaboard System Railroad, successor to the SCL. The former A&WP property is now owned by CSX Transportation.

History

The AWP and the Western Railway of Alabama had financial backing from the parent company of the Georgia Railroad and Banking Company. From 1886 onward the AWP and the Western operated essentially as one railroad under the name "West Point Route". In the 19th and early 20th centuries, the three were controlled through joint lease by the Central of Georgia Railroad and the Louisville and Nashville Railroad (through assignment by its majority owner, the Atlantic Coast Line Railroad).

The CofG sold its interest in 1944. The lines eventually fell under the control of the Seaboard Coast Line Railroad, as a result of a merger between the Atlantic Coast Line and the Seaboard Air Line. All of these lines, plus the Clinchfield Railroad, became the Family Lines System in the 1970s, though all the lines maintained separate corporate identities. Those identities became "fallen flags" when the group was renamed Seaboard System Railroad (SBD). In 1986 SBD merged with Chessie System to form CSX Transportation.

The former AWP line remains in full service today, although  This was 16 months before Amtrak took over most of the nation's long-distance passenger trains. (The Central of Georgia's Man o' War continued to operate for several more months over the A&WP rail line.) The Atlanta & West Point name ended in June 1983, when the railroad company was absorbed by the Seaboard System.

One of AWP's most notable steam locomotives, heavy Pacific AWP 290, survived and was restored to operational status in 1989. The 290 pulled steam excursions around Atlanta from 1989 to 1992 for the "New Georgia Railroad," including a special excursion from Atlanta to Montgomery along the original West Point Route.

List of stations

These stations existed as of 1867.

Trains departed from Atlanta at 12:15PM and arrived there at 8:37AM. West Point was the connecting point further west via the Montgomery and West Point Railroad.

See also

Lemuel P. Grant
Atlanta and West Point 290

References

External links
 Railga.com
 Railroads and the Battle of West Point
 Old Alabama Rails — West Point Route
 Atlanta and West Point Railroad, Passenger Depot, Newnan, Georgia, one of many drawings related to the Atlanta and West Point Railroad in the Georgia State Archives.
 "Steam Locomotion at High Tide!" historical marker, Georgia Info

 
Defunct Georgia (U.S. state) railroads
Railway lines in Atlanta
Seaboard System Railroad
Predecessors of CSX Transportation
Former Class I railroads in the United States
Standard gauge railways in the United States
Railway companies established in 1857
Railway companies disestablished in 1986
5 ft gauge railways in the United States
1857 establishments in Georgia (U.S. state)